"I Know How He Feels" is a song written by Rick Bowles and Will Robinson, and recorded by American country music artist Reba McEntire.  It was released in August 1988 as the second single from the album Reba.  The song was McEntire's eleventh number one country hit.  The single went to number one for one week and spent a total of fourteen weeks on the country chart.

Charts

Weekly charts

Year-end charts

References

1988 singles
1988 songs
Reba McEntire songs
Song recordings produced by Jimmy Bowen
Songs written by Rick Bowles
Songs written by Will Robinson (songwriter)
MCA Records singles